Hermann Gassner Jr (born 29 November 1988 in Bad Reichenhall) is a German rally driver, currently competing in the Super 2000 World Rally Championship (SWRC). His father Hermann Gassner Sr is also a rally driver.

Career
Gassner won the Suzuki Rallye Cup in Germany in 2007, finishing seventh overall in the German Rally Championship and winning Division 4. He made his World Rally Championship debut on Rally Deutschland, which was also a round of the German championship. In 2008 he finished fourth in the German championship in a Mitsubishi Lancer Evo IX. He was also the runner-up in the Mitropa Rally Cup behind his father. He contested the German and British rounds of the WRC, finishing 27th and 20th respectively.

In 2009 Gassner won the German Rally Championship with four wins, as well as the Mitropa Rally Cup. He also entered five rounds of the WRC, with a best result of 12th overall in Portugal. In 2010 Gassner entered six rounds of the WRC in an Evo IX. He finished fourth in the Production World Rally Championship category in Germany, and also finished 13th overall and first in Group N in Spain.

For 2011 Gassner joined the Red Bull Škoda team in the SWRC, finishing third in the category in Jordan, fifth in Sardinia and fourth in Greece.

World Rally Championship results

PWRC results

SWRC results

References

External links

Living people
1988 births
People from Bad Reichenhall
Sportspeople from Upper Bavaria
German rally drivers
World Rally Championship drivers
Škoda Motorsport drivers